Adebayo Mosobalaje Faleti  (26 December 1921 – 23 July 2017) was Africa's first newscaster, Africa's first stage play director, Nigeria's first film editor and librarian with the first television station in Africa - Western Nigeria Television (WNTV), Nigeria's first Yoruba presenter on television and radio alike, a Nigerian poet, journalist, writer, Nollywood film director and actor. He was also known as a Yoruba translator, a broadcaster, TV exponent and pioneer of the first television station in Africa, Western Nigeria Television (WNTV), now known as the Nigerian Television Authority (NTA).

Early life and education 
Faleti was born in Agbo-Oye, Oyo State, though lived in Obananko, Kuranga, near Oyo State. Adebayo Faleti was the first son of his father, Joseph Akanbi Faleti and the only child of his mother, Durowade Ayinke Faleti. Alagba Faleti has always had passion for drama from an early age. His parents could not fund his education to pursue his dreams due to lack of income, so he decided to put his primary education on hold. Later, he gathered a couple of interested colleagues and started his own successful theatre group, named Oyo Youth Operatic Society (founded in 1949). Faleti later found his way back to school by getting a job in a primary school, in which he worked for six years to raise enough funds for his secondary schooling with the financial support of his father. In 1966, he attended the University of Dakar in Senegal and obtained a Certificate of proficiency in French Language and Civilization. Two years later, he graduated from the University of Ibadan, Nigeria, with an honors degree in Lit-in-English. In 1971, he attended the Radio Netherlands Training Center in Hilversum, the Netherlands, and received a certificate in Television Production.

Personal life 
Faleti's wife was Olori Olubunmi Faleti, a retired broadcaster and television host at the Nigerian Television Authority (NTA), Ibadan. He was blessed with children, grandchildren and great grandchildren. Faleti died on July 23, 2017 after observing a brief morning devotion with his family at his Ojoo residence in Ibadan.
.

Career 
Faleti has written, produced and acted in several popular Yoruba plays. He is also known for his poems. He was the first school teacher at Ife Odan, located near Ejigbo Town in Osun State. He was also the General Manager of the Broadcasting Corporation of Oyo State (BCOS), which is also known as Radio OYO, Ibadan. In 1959, he worked at Western Nigerian Television (WNTV), now known as NTA Ibadan, as a film editor and a librarian.

Works 
Faleti has acted, written, and produced a number of movies, which include: Thunderbolt: Magun (2001), Afonja (1 & 2) (2002), Basorun Gaa (2004), and Sawo-Sogberi (2005).

He was responsible for translating Nigeria's National Anthem from English to Yoruba, his native language. He also translated speeches being made by former Attorney-General of the Federal Republic of Nigeria - Chief Bola Ige, former military president of Nigeria - General Ibrahim Babangida, former premier of the Western region of Nigeria — Chief Obafemi Awolowo and Head, National Interim Government of Nigeria — Chief Ernest Shonekan, from English to Yoruba. Faleti has published a dictionary containing the formal or official use of Yoruba names.

Awards
Adebayo Faleti has received many awards, both locally and internationally, including the National Honour Of Officer Of the Order of the Niger (OON), Doctor of Letters (D.Litt.), Justice of Peace (JP), Jerusalem Pilgrim (JP). Adebayo Faleti received the Festival of Arts award with "Eda Ko L’aropin" in 1995 and the Afro-Hollywood Award for Outstanding Performance in Arts in the United States (in 2002). His movie - "Basorun Gaa" also received a commendation at Breeze Awards in London as the best epic movie of the year in 2004. The first ever magazine he wrote for was called Triumph when he was at the University of Ibadan as an undergraduate. He was also a columnist with the Nigerian Tribune.

References 

1921 births
2017 deaths
Nigerian male film actors
Nigerian writers
University of Ibadan alumni
Yoruba male actors
Cheikh Anta Diop University alumni
21st-century Nigerian male actors
English–Yoruba translators
Male actors in Yoruba cinema
Yoruba-language writers
Nigerian folklorists
20th-century translators
20th-century Nigerian writers
Nigerian broadcasters
Nigerian television personalities
Yoruba television personalities
Yoruba writers
Yoruba journalists
Nigerian poets
Nigerian film directors
Nigerian male television actors
People from Oyo State
Nigerian media personalities
Nigerian television presenters
Nigerian editors
Nigerian journalists
Nigerian film editors